Reeves v CH Robinson Worldwide, Inc,  5 No. 07-10270 (11th Cir. January 20, 2010) is a US labor law case under Title VII of the Civil Rights Act of 1964 heard  before the United States Court of Appeals for the Eleventh Circuit which ruled  that a hostile work environment can be created in a workplace where sexually explicit language  and pornography are present.  A  hostile workplace may exist even if it is not targeted at any  particular employee.

Facts
Ms. Reeves was the only woman working in her area as a transportation sales representative in the Birmingham, Ala., office of C.H. Robinson, an Eden Prairie, Minnesota-based transportation services firm. In her lawsuit she claimed that "sexually offensive language permeated the work environment" from both her co-workers and her supervisor. Sexually explicit radio programming played on a daily basis and when she complained about it she was told it was up to her to play her own radio stations. When she did change the channel others would change it back. She resigned in 2004 and filed a complaint in 2006, claiming that the sexually offensive language created a hostile work environment. 

A lower court dismissed her case granting summary judgment to her employer. Reeves appealed.

Judgment
The United States Court of Appeals for the Eleventh Circuit which ruled  that a hostile work environment can be created in a workplace where sexually explicit language  and pornography are present.  A  hostile workplace may exist even if it is not targeted at any  particular employee.

See also
US labor law

Notes

United States labor case law
United States case law
Harassment case law
2010 in United States case law
Sexual harassment in the United States
United States employment discrimination case law
United States gender discrimination case law